The 1956 Brisbane Rugby League season was the 48th season of the Brisbane Rugby League premiership. Seven teams from across Brisbane competed for the premiership, which culminated in Past Brothers defeating Western Suburbs 17-10 in the grand final.

Ladder

Finals 

Source:

References 

Rugby league in Brisbane
Brisbane Rugby League season